Events from the year 1673 in England.

Incumbents
 Monarch – Charles II
 Parliament – Cavalier

Events
 22 January – impostor Mary Carleton is hanged in Newgate Prison in London for multiple thefts and returning from penal transportation.
 8 March – under pressure from Parliament, King Charles II withdraws the Royal Declaration of Indulgence.
 29 March – the Test Act is passed, preventing Roman Catholics from holding public office.
 28 May (7 June New Style) – Third Anglo-Dutch War: First Battle of Schooneveld – The Dutch Republic fleet commanded by Michiel de Ruyter defeats the allied Anglo-French fleet commanded by Prince Rupert of the Rhine.
 4 June (14 June New Style) – Third Anglo-Dutch War: Second Battle of Schooneveld – The Dutch fleet again defeats the Anglo-French.
 12 June – James, Duke of York, is forced to resign the office of Lord High Admiral because of the Test Act, making his Catholicism public.
 19 June – Thomas Osborne becomes Lord High Treasurer.
 3 July – Elkanah Settle's play The Empress of Morocco first publicly performed at the Dorset Garden Theatre in London by the Duke's Company and published with illustrations.
 30 July (9 August New Style) – Third Anglo-Dutch War: a Dutch fleet retakes New York in the American colonies, renaming it New Orange.
 11 August (21 August New Style) – Third Anglo-Dutch War: Battle of Texel (Kijkduin) – The Dutch fleet again defeats the Anglo-French, preventing England's Blackheath Army from landing in Zeeland.
 9 November – the King removes Anthony Ashley Cooper, 1st Earl of Shaftesbury, from his position as Lord Chancellor.
 14 November – architect Christopher Wren is knighted.
 23 November – the widowed James, Duke of York, the King's brother and heir, marries Mary of Modena; they meet for the first time immediately before the ceremony in Dover.

Undated
 Chelsea Physic Garden established as the Apothecaries’ Garden in London.

Births
 6 January – James Brydges, 1st Duke of Chandos, Member of Parliament (died 1744)
 3 February – Philip Stanhope, 3rd Earl of Chesterfield, (died 1726)
 21 July – John Weaver, dancer and choreographer (died 1760)
 August – Henry FitzJames, illegitimate son of James II (died 1702)
 11 August – Richard Mead, physician (died 1754)
 16 October – Lady Mary Tudor, illegitimate daughter of Charles II, child actress (died 1726)
 Sir James Lowther, 4th Baronet, Member of Parliament (died 1755)
 John Oldmixon, historian (died 1742)
 James Stanhope, 1st Earl Stanhope, statesman and soldier (died 1721)

Deaths
 22 January – Mary Carleton, imposter (born 1642) (hanged)
 20 May – Sir Edward Bagot, 2nd Baronet, Member of Parliament (born 1616)
 12 July – Sir William Strickland, 1st Baronet, Member of Parliament (born c. 1596)
 13 July – Sir Robert Long, 1st Baronet, politician (born c. 1600)
 21 August – Henry Grey, 1st Earl of Stamford, soldier (born c. 1599)
 10 October – Thomas Bradley, priest (born 1597)
 17 October – Thomas Clifford, 1st Baron Clifford of Chudleigh, statesman (born 1630)
 15 December – Margaret Cavendish, writer (born 1623)
 31 December – Oliver St John, statesman and judge (born c. 1598)
 Henry Herbert, Master of the Revels (born 1595)
 William Rainborowe, Leveller (year of birth unknown)

References

 
Years of the 17th century in England